The Bahama warbler (Setophaga flavescens) is a species of bird in the family Parulidae. It is endemic to The Bahamas.

The taxon was formerly lumped with the yellow-throated warbler (Setophaga dominica), until the Bahama warbler was elevated to full species in 2011. A distinction between species is made in that the Bahama warbler is restricted to pinewoods, possesses a longer bill, and has small variations in plumage color.

Habitat 
Its natural habitat is pine forest on Grand Bahama, Little Abaco and Great Abaco islands. It has not been observed outside of this range.

Behavior
The Bahama warbler forages amidst pine needles in the higher branches of pine forests, occasionally descending to forage in the shrubs of the understory. It also uses its long bill to probe under the bark of tree trunks in search of insects. No other warblers in the region feed along trunks as extensively as the Bahama warbler.

References

Bahama warbler
Endemic birds of the Bahamas
Bahama warbler
Bahama warbler